In enzymology, a CDP-paratose 2-epimerase is an enzyme that catalyzes the chemical reaction

CDP-3,6-dideoxy-D-glucose  CDP-3,6-dideoxy-D-mannose

Hence, this enzyme has one substrate, CDP-3,6-dideoxy-D-glucose, and one product, CDP-3,6-dideoxy-D-mannose.

This enzyme belongs to the family of isomerases, specifically those racemases and epimerases acting on carbohydrates and derivatives.  The systematic name of this enzyme class is CDP-3,6-dideoxy-D-glucose 2-epimerase. Other names in common use include CDP-paratose epimerase, cytidine diphosphoabequose epimerase, cytidine diphosphodideoxyglucose epimerase, cytidine diphosphoparatose epimerase, and cytidine diphosphate paratose-2-epimerase.  It is also incorrectly known as CDP-abequose epimerase, and CDP-D-abequose 2-epimerase.  This enzyme participates in starch and sucrose metabolism.  It employs one cofactor, NAD+.

References

 
 

EC 5.1.3
NADH-dependent enzymes
Enzymes of unknown structure